The surname Pala may refer to:

Pala dynasty (disambiguation)
Ano Pala, Papua New Guinean politician
Doğukan Pala, Turkish footballer
František Pála, Czech tennis player
Hubert Pala, Polish footballer
İskender Pala, Turkish professor and writer
Kila Pala (born 1986),Papua New Guinean cricketer
Libor Pala, Czech football coach
Mathias Pala (born 1989), French rugby league player 
Ondřej Pála,  Czech professional boxer
Petr Pála, Czech tennis player
Vincent Pala, Indian politician